Westcott Beach State Park is a  state park in Jefferson County, New York. The park is located at the eastern end of Lake Ontario in the Town of Henderson.

Park description
Westcott Beach State Park offers a beach, a playground and playing fields, picnic tables and pavilions, a nature trail, a group campsite, hunting and fishing, a boat launch and docks, and a food concession. Trails for hiking, cross-country skiing and snowshoeing are available. The park also offers a campground with 168 campsites.

See also
 List of New York state parks

References

External links
 New York State Parks: Westcott Beach State Park
 Westcott Beach State Park trail map

State parks of New York (state)
Parks in Jefferson County, New York